John Harrison Surratt  Jr. (April 13, 1844 – April 21, 1916) was an American  Confederate spy who was accused of plotting with John Wilkes Booth to kidnap U.S. President Abraham Lincoln; he was also suspected of involvement in the Abraham Lincoln assassination. His mother, Mary Surratt, was convicted of conspiracy by a military tribunal and hanged; she owned the boarding house that the conspirators used as a safe house and to plot the scheme.

He eluded arrest following the assassination by fleeing to Canada and then to Europe. He thus avoided the fate of the other conspirators, who were hanged. He served briefly as a Pontifical Zouave but was recognized and arrested. He escaped to Egypt but was eventually arrested and extradited. By the time of his trial, the statute of limitations had expired on most of the potential charges which meant that he was never tried.

Early life
He was born in 1844, to John Harrison Surratt Sr. and Mary Elizabeth Jenkins Surratt, in what is today Congress Heights. His baptism took place in 1844 at St. Peter's Church, Washington, D.C. In 1861, he was enrolled at St. Charles College, where he was studying for the priesthood and also met Louis Weichmann. When his father suddenly died in 1862, Surratt was appointed the postmaster for Surrattsville, Maryland.

Plot to kidnap Lincoln
Surratt served as a Confederate Secret Service courier and spy. After he had been carrying dispatches about Union troop movements across the Potomac River. Dr. Samuel Mudd introduced Surratt to Booth on December 23, 1864, and Surratt agreed to help Booth kidnap Lincoln. The meeting took place at the National Hotel, in Washington, D.C., where Booth lived.

Booth's plan was to seize Lincoln and take him to Richmond, Virginia, to exchange him for thousands of Confederate prisoners of war. On March 17, 1865, Surratt and Booth, along with their comrades, waited in ambush for Lincoln's carriage to leave the Campbell General Hospital to return to Washington. However, Lincoln had changed his mind and remained in Washington.

William H. Crook, one of Lincoln's bodyguards, claimed that Surratt had boarded the River Queen shortly before the Third Battle of Petersburg, using the name of Smith and demanding to see Lincoln (who was aboard at the time). Crook later stated his belief that Surratt "was seeking an opportunity to assassinate the President at this time".

Assassination of Lincoln
After the assassination of Lincoln, on April 14, 1865, Surratt denied any involvement and said that he was then in Elmira, New York. He was one of the first people suspected of the attempt to assassinate Secretary of State William H. Seward, but the culprit was soon discovered to be Lewis Powell.

In hiding
When he learned of the assassination, Surratt fled to Montreal, Canada East, arriving on April 17, 1865. He then went to St. Liboire, where a Catholic priest, Father Charles Boucher, gave him sanctuary. Surratt remained there while his mother was arrested, tried, and hanged in the United States for conspiracy.

Aided by ex-Confederate agents Beverly Tucker and Edwin Lee, Surratt, disguised, booked passage under a false name. He landed at Liverpool in September, where he lodged in the oratory at the Church of the Holy Cross.

Surratt would later serve for a time in the Ninth Company of the Pontifical Zouaves, in the Papal States, under the name John Watson.

An old friend, Henri Beaumont de Sainte-Marie, recognized Surratt and notified papal officials and the US minister in Rome, Rufus King. Henri was introduced to John Surratt and Louis Weichmann in April 1863 at St. Joseph's Catholic School in the town then known as Ellengowan or Little Texas (now a part of Cockeysville, Maryland) by Father Mahoney.  Henri taught at the school for five months in 1863 having been hired by Fr. Mahoney at the request of Maria Padian. Although Canadian, Henri wanted to join the Confederate Army when the Civil War broke out.  Henri traveled to New York and boarded a ship that was to run the blockade of the Southern States.  “The ship, however, was captured by a United States war steamer and Sainte Marie with his fellow voyagers was thrown into Fort McHenry as a prisoner of war.” Henri was released through the intervention of the English Consul since he was a British subject.  Henri was then stranded in Baltimore with little money and his plan was to move into a cheap boarding house and get a job to earn some money.  Fate intervened and “one day an old farmer living in the country outside of Baltimore came to his place.”   Henri related his misfortunes to the old farmer, who took mercy on him and gave him a job on his farm.  Henri accepted the job offer.  It was on this farm that Maria Padian “happened to pay a visit to Sainte Marie’s benefactor to collect money for the church at Little Texas.”   Maria was a very active member of St. Joseph’s Catholic Church, not only visiting to collect money for the church, but also a member of the ‘Texas Fancy Table’ at the 1895 Church Fair, and even donating a stained glass window.   Maria was also the daughter of Richard Padian for whom Padonia Road, as well as the old North Central Railroad stop Padonia Station, was named. By all accounts, Maria, single and for whom most eligible men her age were off fighting in the Civil War, was bowled over by Henri and strongly “captivated with his polished manners, good looks, handsome brown eyes, refined conversation, and general education, and listened early to the recital of his adventures.” and made a plea to Fr. Mahoney to hire her new friend for the school.    

On November 7, 1866, Surratt was arrested and sent to the Velletri prison. He escaped and lived with the supporters of Garibaldi, who gave him safe passage. Surratt traveled to the Kingdom of Italy and posed as a Canadian citizen named Walters. He booked passage to Alexandria, Egypt, but was arrested there by US officials on November 23, 1866, still in his Pontifical Zouaves uniform. He returned to the US on the USS Swatara to the Washington Navy Yard in early 1867.

Trial

Eighteen months after his mother was hanged, Surratt was tried in a Maryland civilian court. It was not before a military commission, unlike the trials of his mother and the others, as a US Supreme Court decision, Ex parte Milligan, had declared the trial of civilians before military tribunals to be unconstitutional if civilian courts were still open.

Judge David Carter presided over Surratt's trial, and Edwards Pierrepont conducted the federal government's case against him. Surratt's lead attorney, Joseph Habersham Bradley, admitted Surratt's part in plotting to kidnap Lincoln but denied any involvement in the murder plot. After two months of testimony, Surratt was released after a mistrial; eight jurors had voted not guilty, four voted guilty.

The statute of limitations on charges other than murder had run out, and Surratt was released on bail.

Later life
Surratt tried to farm tobacco and then taught at the Rockville Female Academy. In 1870, as one of the last surviving members of the conspiracy, Surratt began a much-heralded public lecture tour. On December 6, at a small courthouse in Rockville, Maryland, in a 75-minute speech, Surratt admitted his involvement in the scheme to kidnap Lincoln. However, he maintained that he knew nothing of the assassination plot and reiterated that he was then in Elmira. He disavowed any participation by the Confederate government, reviled Weichmann as a "perjurer" who was responsible for his mother's death and said his friends had kept from him the seriousness of her plight in Washington. After that revelation, it was reported in Washington's Evening Star that the band played "Dixie" and a small concert was improvised, with Surratt the center of female attention.

Three weeks later, Surratt was to give a second lecture in Washington, but it was canceled because of public outrage.

Surratt later took a job as a teacher in St. Joseph Catholic School in Emmitsburg, Maryland. In 1872, Surratt married Mary Victorine Hunter, a second cousin of Francis Scott Key. The couple lived in Baltimore and had seven children.

Some time after 1872, he was hired by the Baltimore Steam Packet Company. He rose to freight auditor and, ultimately, treasurer of the company. Surratt retired from the steamship line in 1914 and died of pneumonia in 1916, at the age of 72.

He was buried in the New Cathedral Cemetery, in Baltimore.

In film
Surratt was portrayed by Johnny Simmons in the 2010 Robert Redford film The Conspirator.

See also
James W. Pumphrey – Surratt introduced Booth to Pumphrey, who supplied Booth's getaway horse.

References

Sources

External links
John Surratt
Text of John Surratt's public lecture giving his version of the conspiracy
A map and timeline of John Surratt's two-year flight and eventual capture
John H. Surratt's career as a teacher after the assassination aftermath

1844 births
1916 deaths
Confederate States Army soldiers
People from Washington, D.C.
Maryland postmasters
Lincoln assassination conspirators
People of Washington, D.C., in the American Civil War
Deaths from pneumonia in Maryland
St. Charles College alumni
American Roman Catholics
Papal Zouaves
Burials in Maryland